The Arrawanna Bridge is a historic bridge, spanning the Coginchaug River near Berlin Street in Middletown, Connecticut, USA.  Built in 1918, it is an early example in the state of an open-spandrel concrete arch bridge, and is one of the state's oldest bridges.  It was listed on the National Register of Historic Places in 2004.  The bridge is now closed to all traffic.

Description and history
The Arrawanna Bridge is located west of downtown Middletown, beyond the western end of Berlin Street, which now terminates before the bridge.

The bridge was built in 1918 and designed by the Connecticut Highway Department.  The bridge is one of the oldest surviving structures of Connecticut's state highway department, and is the only barrel-arch design of the state's six open-spandrel bridges. "Even as a near ruin, it adds to our appreciation of the high level of technical expertise shown by the state's first bridge engineers, and it recalls the very first years of state-highway bridge construction in Connecticut."

At the time it was built, reinforced concrete was a relatively new material for bridge construction. The bridge was featured in the 1918 annual report of the Connecticut Highway Department. The bridge is owned by the city of Middletown.

Berlin Street was at that time the major route leading north from downtown Middletown.  In 1974 and new alignment of Connecticut Route 3 bypassed Berlin Street to the west, and the bridge was closed.  By 2003, the bridge was deteriorating in place, with shrubs growing in the roadway.

See also
National Register of Historic Places listings in Middletown, Connecticut
List of bridges on the National Register of Historic Places in Connecticut

References

Road bridges on the National Register of Historic Places in Connecticut
Bridges completed in 1918
Bridges in Middlesex County, Connecticut
National Register of Historic Places in Middlesex County, Connecticut
1918 establishments in Connecticut
Concrete bridges in the United States
Open-spandrel deck arch bridges in the United States